Volunteers is the fifth studio album by American psychedelic rock band Jefferson Airplane, released in 1969 on RCA Records. The album was controversial because of its revolutionary and anti-war lyrics, along with the use of profanity. The original album title was Volunteers of Amerika, but it was shortened after objections from Volunteers of America, a religious charity.

This was the last album with the group for both Jefferson Airplane founder Marty Balin and drummer Spencer Dryden (although they did both appear on the "Mexico" single released in 1970 and its B-side "Have You Seen the Saucers?").  The album signifies the end of the best-remembered "classic" lineup of musicians.  It turned out to be the group's last all-new LP for two years.  Jack Casady and Jorma Kaukonen devoted more of their energy to their embryonic blues group Hot Tuna, while Paul Kantner and Grace Slick released Blows Against the Empire and Sunfighter with various guest musicians and celebrated the birth of their daughter China in 1971.

History 
Volunteers was the group's first album recorded entirely in San Francisco, at Wally Heider's state-of-the-art 16-track studio. Guest musicians included Jerry Garcia on pedal steel guitar, veteran session pianist Nicky Hopkins, future Airplane drummer Joey Covington on percussion, David Crosby and Stephen Stills. The album was among the earliest 16-track recordings, and its back cover shows a picture of the Ampex MM-1000 professional 16-track tape recorder used to record the album.

The album was marked with strong anti-war and pro-anarchism songs. The theme of nature, communities and ecology was also explored with the songs "The Farm" and "Eskimo Blue Day". The title was inspired by a Volunteers of America (a religious charity similar to the Salvation Army) truck that woke singer Marty Balin one morning. The original title was Volunteers of Amerika; spelling "America" as "Amerika" was a common practice used by leftists at the time to emphasize their dissatisfaction with the American government, as it usually references both German fascism and the Kafka novel Amerika. After Volunteers of America objected, the title was shortened to Volunteers.

The album provoked even more controversy with lyrics such as "Up against the wall, motherfucker," which appeared in the opening song, "We Can Be Together". The offending word was mixed lower on the 45 RPM release of that track to partially obscure it, but it was still audible. However, the word "motherfucker" was censored on the album lyric sheet as "fred". RCA Records had refused to allow the word "fuck" on the album until confronted with the fact that the label had already set a precedent on the Hair cast recording album. "Eskimo Blue Day" was also a point of contention, with its chorus line of "doesn't mean shit to a tree" repeated throughout.

The album is characterized by Jorma Kaukonen's lead guitar parts (the dueling solos on "Hey Fredrick", plus the traditional gospel-blues song "Good Shepherd" and "Wooden Ships") and Hopkins' distinctive piano playing. It also featured the band experimenting with a country rock sound, particularly on "The Farm" and "Song for All Seasons".

Despite its controversies, the album was a commercial success. It peaked at No. 13 (becoming the band's fourth Top 20 record) on the Billboard album chart album chart and received a RIAA gold certification within two months of its release.

Release history 
Though the album was released in late 1969, the cover photo dates back to 1967; it features the band wearing disguises and was taken during the filming of a promotional film made for the "Martha" single.

In addition to the usual two channel stereo version, a specially remixed four channel quadraphonic version of the album appeared in 1973. This was released on LP using the Quadradisc system. It was also released in quad reel-to-reel and 8-track tape tape formats. The quad mixes are different from stereo; "Hey Fredrick" has a completely different lead vocal along with different guitar lines and  coda, "Volunteers" is a totally different recording, Kaukonen's guitar lines are different on "We Can Be Together", "Wooden Ships" lacks the opening sailboat sound effects and the backing vocals by Ace of Cups on "The Farm" are more prominent. A few tracks from the quad version were included in the three CD box set Jefferson Airplane Loves You, though on this release the four channel recordings are reduced to two channels due to the technical limitations of CD.

The 2004 CD re-release features five additional bonus tracks from the group's annual Thanksgiving concert at the Fillmore East, New York in 1969.

Legacy 
In 2003 the album was ranked number 370 in Rolling Stone magazine's list of the 500 greatest albums of all time, and at 373 in a 2012 revised list. Volunteers was omitted from the 2020 list.

In 2003, David Keenan included Volunteers in his The Best Albums Ever...Honest from the Scottish Sunday Herald.

The album was released again in 2009, along with the entirety of the group's live performance at the Woodstock Festival in 1969, as Jefferson Airplane Woodstock Experience.

Track listing 
Credits from original stereo and quadraphonic LPs.

Personnel 
Per liner notes.
Jefferson Airplane
 Grace Slick – vocals, piano on "The Farm", "Hey Fredrick", "Eskimo Blue Day" and "Volunteers", organ on "Meadowlands", recorder on "Eskimo Blue Day"
 Marty Balin – vocals, percussion
 Paul Kantner – vocals, rhythm guitar
 Jorma Kaukonen – lead guitar, vocals
 Jack Casady – bass
 Spencer Dryden – drums, percussion
Additional personnel
 Nicky Hopkins – piano on "We Can Be Together", "Hey Fredrick", "Wooden Ships", "A Song for All Seasons" and "Volunteers"
 Stephen Stills – Hammond organ on "Turn My Life Down"
 Jerry Garcia – pedal steel guitar on "The Farm"
 Joey Covington – congas on "Turn My Life Down", chair on "Eskimo Blue Day"
 David Crosby – sailboat on "Wooden Ships"
 Ace of Cups – vocals on "The Farm" and "Turn My Life Down"
 Bill Laudner – lead vocals on "A Song for All Seasons"

Production 
 Al Schmitt – producer
 Rich Schmitt – engineer
 Maurice (Pat Ieraci) – 16-track
 Gut – album design, ate PB & J
 Milton Burke – album design
 Jefferson Airplane – album design
 Jim Marshall – cover photography
 Jim Smircich – back photography
 Littie Herbie Greene Herb Greene – PB & J photo
 Produced at Wally Heider Studios, San Francisco

Charts 
Album

Single

References 

1969 albums
Jefferson Airplane albums
Live at the Fillmore East albums
RCA Records albums
2004 live albums
RCA Records live albums
Albums produced by Al Schmitt
Albums recorded at Wally Heider Studios
Acid rock albums
Obscenity controversies in music